Thomas Fothergill D.D. (1715/6–1796) was an English cleric and academic administrator at the University of Oxford.

Life
He was the son of Henry Fothergill of Westmorland, and brother of George Fothergill. He matriculated at The Queen's College, Oxford  in 1734, graduating B.A. 1739 and M.A. 1742. He became a Fellow of the college in 1751.

Fothergill was elected Provost (head of house) of The Queen's College, Oxford in 1767, a post he held until his death in 1796.
During his time as Provost, he was also Vice-Chancellor of Oxford University from 1772 until 1776.

Works
 The Qualifications and Advantages of Religious Trust in Times of Danger: A Sermon Preached Before the Mayor and Corporation, at St. Martin's in Oxford, on Friday, February 11, 1757 (1757)

Family
Fothergill married Mary Billingsley, daughter of the Rev. John Billingsley (died 1751), rector of Newington, Oxfordshire. Their son Henry became rector of Althorne.

References

Year of birth missing
Provosts of The Queen's College, Oxford
Vice-Chancellors of the University of Oxford
1796 deaths